The Tajik Ambassador in Beijing is the official representative of the Government in Dushanbe to the Government of China.

List of representatives

 China–Tajikistan relations

References 

 
China
Tajikistan